Charlotte Wilhelmina Franziska Brandes (Minna) (21 May 1765 – 13 June 1788) was a German singer, pianist, actress and composer.

She was born in Berlin, the daughter of actress Esther Charlotte Brandes and playwright , and toured with her parents in Europe, performing on stage at an early age.

She studied music with Hönecke in Weimar and Christoph Transchel in Dresden for piano, Muriottini in Dresden and also Gertrud Elisabeth Mara and Giovanni Carlo Concialini for voice.

After completing her studies, Brandes worked as a singer and actress and composed songs and works for piano. She had a three octave range and performed successfully in courts and opera. After 1782 she lived in Hamburg, and died there.

Works
Brandes composed works for piano and Italian and German songs which were edited by Friedrich Hoenicke, Music Director of Beyme Hamburg theater, and published after her death. Her works are published as A Musical Legacy. Selected compositions include:

Allegro
Harvest song, Allegretto
To the Nightingale, Lento
May Song, Allegretto
Winter Song, Andante Moderato
The dream, Adagio
The old farmer and his son, Andante
Spring Song, Andante
Sigh, Largo
Cavatina Larghetto, for two horns in F, flute, bassoon, two violins, viola, soprano, bass, harpsichord
Duetto for soprano and orchestra
Largo for orchestra

References

1765 births
1788 deaths
18th-century classical composers
Women classical composers
German classical composers
18th-century German actresses
German stage actresses
Actresses from Berlin
Musicians from Berlin
18th-century German composers
18th-century women composers